HOTA is an acronym for Home Office Type Approval, a testing and certification process by the Home Office in the United Kingdom that speed cameras must pass before evidence from them can be admissible in UK courts by way of certification in accordance with Section 20 of the Road Traffic Offenders Act 1988 (RTOA) (Amended by the Road Traffic Act 1991). It is a misconception that speed enforcement devices must be Home Office Type Approved before they may be deployed on public roads to gather evidence of speeding offences however if the device does not have UK Type Approval then the evidence from the device is not able to be certified but must be adduced by a witness and perhaps an expert witness who is able to adduce evidence of its accuracy.  The Road Traffic Offenders Act route via Section 20 certification is a clear advantage over the unapproved equipment route to court.

The Type Approval of devices that meet the definitions or more accurately "prescriptions" of types of devices in Statutory Instruments (forms of secondary legislation) is administered by the Home Office Road Crimes Section with the scientific scrutiny now performed by The Defence Science and Technology Laboratory (DSTL) in conjunction with accredited technical laboratories.  The National Police Chiefs Council (NPCC) oversee a secretariat who coordinate police and laboratory testing of equipment in the process.

Only when DSTL scrutiny, laboratory testing and road testing is completed, and the equipment fully meets the specifications in the relevant Home Office Speedmeter Handbook will the equipment be recommended to the Secretary of State to be awarded UK Type Approval. Once recommended an administrative process takes place between the Home Office and the UK manufacturer or distributing agent in which a contract (Type Approval Agreement) is exchanged and agreed between both parties. When that contract is signed then a Type Approval Certificate is signed by a minister at the Home Office; the equipment can then be used to produce certifiable evidence, evidence of speeding that is admissible in UK courts without the support of a witness. There is no requirement to place the Type Approval Agreement or Certificate of Type Approval before Parliament because the Statutory Instrument defining the "type" of equipment has already been fully ratified by both Houses of Parliament.

The accuracies required to meet HOTA, as laid out in the Speedmeter Handbooks, are agreed internationally. They are not particularly challenging to meet for modern digital equipment however, HOTA requirements extend beyond accuracies; it is often the requirement that an instrument must not cause a violation record to be made when no violation exists that is the most difficult to meet.  The Speedmeter Handbooks are freely and openly available to view, they provide guidance to manufacturers and the accredited test laboratories in the general requirements.  DSTL and the Home Office may vary the requirements at any time and may adapt them depending upon the equipment that is to be assessed, the Handbooks being "guidance".

Unlike Approval systems in most countries no equipment is Approved without a police input into the testing.  Rather than simply testing speed accuracy, the systems are all tested in real traffic situations some of which are created specifically to test a perceived weakness in the systems.  Track and real road testing is always conducted so that all kinds of vehicles and traffic situations are used to stimulate the systems.  Roadside equipment such as fixed cameras must pass environmental testing before deployment in road testing.  The period used for road testing ensures that the systems are tested in all weathers.

If one detection is made that is outside of the accuracy parameters or if one violation record is produced when no violation existed during any test, then the device will fail its Approval until that error is rectified to the satisfaction of the Home Office and DSTL.  When rectification is demonstrated testing may recommence.

References

External links
Home Office approved speed detection devices - March 2007 archived Link Retrieved 2016-10-21

Speed camera types used in the United Kingdom